Quercus hypargyrea is an Asian species of tree in the beech family Fagaceae. It is native to south-central and southeast China, in particular the provinces of Anhui, Fujian, Guangxi, Hubei, Hunan, Jiangxi, Shaanxi, and Sichuan. It has incorrectly been known as Quercus multinervis, which is properly the name of a fossil species. It is placed in subgenus Cerris, section Cyclobalanopsis.

Quercus hypargyrea is a tree up to 12 m tall. Leaves can be as much as 15.5 cm long.

Taxonomy
Quercus hypargyrea was first described as Quercus glauca var. hypargyrea in 1900 by Ludwig Diels, who attributed the name to Karl Otto von Seemen. It was raised to a full species in 1992. Independently, the species was described as Cyclobalanopsis multinervis in 1963. In 1998, this was transferred to Quercus as "Quercus multinervis". However, this name had already been published in 1859 for a fossil species, so is illegitimate.

It is in placed in subgenus Cerris, section Cyclobalanopsis.

References

External links
photo of herbarium specimen at Missouri Botanical Garden, collected in China

hypargyrea
Flora of South-Central China
Flora of Southeast China
Plants described in 1900